MTV Nordic was a pan-European cable television network launched on 5 June 1998. A 24-hour English-language network aimed at viewers in the Nordic countries and other European territories. Between 1998 and 2006 MTV Nordic served the majority of European territories (that did not have their own localized MTV channel) under the branding MTV Europe & Nordic. The majority of programming was hosted by presenters from the Nordic countries, mainly Sweden, Denmark and Norway.
Additional veejays came from Israel, United States, Ireland and the United Kingdom. The channel gradually began to localize in May 2005 with the launch of MTV Denmark and in September 2005 the launch of MTV Sweden, MTV Norway and MTV Finland, which resulted in the MTV Nordic ceasing as a brand.

On February 22, 2019, the local MTV channels for the Nordic region were replaced by the relaunch of MTV Nordic which features no advertising or sponsorships. Despite this, separate social media accounts and websites still exist for the local languages.

In early 2020, MTV Nordic as a branding began to reappear on MTV's social media sites within the Nordic region.

On February 1, 2021, MTV Nordic was replaced with MTV Europe.

Programming

 16 and Pregnant 
 90's House
 Amazingness
 Are You the One?
 Are You the One? Second Chances
 Awkward
 Car Crash Couples
 Catfish: The TV Show
 Catfish: Trolls
 Celebrity Ex on the Beach
 Double Shot at Love
 Ex on the Beach
 Ex on the Beach US
 Ex on the Beach: Body SOS
 Faking It
 Families of the Mafia
 Floribama Shore
 How Far Is Tattoo Far?
 Game of Clones
 Geordie OGs
 Geordie Shore
 Geordie Shore: Their Story
 Jersey Shore
 Jersey Shore: Family Vacation
 Just Tattoo of Us
 Lindsay Lohan's Beach Club
 Million Dollar Baby
 MTV Breakfast Club
 MTV Night Videos
 MTV Push
 My Super Sweet 16
 Promposal
 Revenge Prank
 Ridiculousness
 Siesta Key
 Single AF
 Spring Break with Grandad
 Suspect
 Teen Mom 2
 Teen Mom 3
 Teen Mom OG
 Teen Mom UK
 The Hills
 The Hills: New Beginnings

Original version 

 Nordic Top 5
 MTV Nordic Top 40
 News Weekend Edition
 Hitlist UK
 Euro Top 20
 US Top 20
 Axl Meets
 Spanking New
 MTV at the Movies
 Select MTV
 Dance Floor Chart
 Stylissimo
 MTV News
 Non-stop Hits
 Don't Stop The Music
 This is the new shit
 This is our Music
 mtv:new
 Most Selected
 MTV Amour
 MTV Summer Festivals
 Superock
 MTV Hot
 Top Selection
 Total Request
 3 from 1 on the Web
 Bytesize
 Data Videos
 Up North
 Alternative Nation
 Chill Out Zone

Presenters

Original version 
 Eden Harel (1994–2002) European Top 20, Select MTV, Dancefloor Chart
 Lars Beckung mtv:new
 Axl Smith (2004-) Spanking New, Axl Meets, MTV News, MTV At The Festivals,
 Thomas Madvig
 Maria Guzenina
 Vanessa Warwick Headbangers Ball
 Rebecca De Ruvo Awake on the Wild Side, Dial MTV
 Camila Raznovich (1995–1998) MTV Amour, Hangin' Out, MTV Summer Festivals, MTV Beach House
 Cat Deeley (1997–2002) Hit List UK, Stylissimo, MTV News
 Julia Valet Superock, MTV Hot
 Trevor Nelson The Lick
 Becky Griffin Dancefloor Chart
 Neil Cole European Top 20, Select MTV, The Fridge
 Joanne Colan European Top 20
 Kicki Berg Select MTV, European Top 20, Nordic Top 5, MTV Supermercado
 Ulrika Eriksson Hitlist UK, Select MTV
 Ina Géraldine (2003–2004) Euro Top 20
 Amelia Hoy (2004–2006) Euro Top 20
 DP Fitzgerald MTV News Update
 Jason Danino-Holt (2006) Switched On
 Charlotte Thorstvedt (2006–2009) Euro Top 20
 Trey Farley Select MTV
 Katja Schuurman So 90's

See also
 List of MTV Europe VJs
 MTV Denmark
 MTV Finland
 MTV Norway
 MTV Sweden
 MTV Networks Baltic
 MTV Europe

References

External links
 MTV Denmark
 MTV Finland
 MTV Norway
 MTV Sweden
 Official MTV Nordic Website
 Original MTVE.COM website
 MTV Networks Nordic Website

MTV channels
Television channels and stations established in 1998
1998 establishments in Europe
Television channels and stations disestablished in 2005
2005 disestablishments in Europe
Television channels and stations established in 2019
2019 establishments in Europe
Television channels and stations disestablished in 2021
2021 disestablishments in Europe
Music organizations based in Sweden
Television channel articles with incorrect naming style